Lambayeque is a city on the coast of northern Peru and capital of the homonymous district and province in the department of Lambayeque. It is located 4.7 km from the city of Chiclayo and 13 km from the Pacific Ocean. It is an important cultural and educational center of the department as it houses some of the most important museums in the country, such as the Royal Tombs Museum and the Brüning Museum. It was founded in 1553 under the name of San Pedro de Lambayeque by order of the Viceroy Conde de Nieva.

History 
In January 2022, two people were killed in Lambayeque, where the tsunami caused by the eruption of Hunga Tonga–Hunga Ha'apai measured 2 metres (6 ft 7 in).

Geography

The vast plains of Túcume are part of the Lambayeque Valley, the largest valley of the north coast of Peru. The Lambayeque Valley is the site of natural and man-made waterways and is also a region of about 250 decaying and heavily eroded mud-brick pyramids.

Archaeology

The Brüning Museum, established in the early 20th century, contains hundreds of gold and silver pieces, as well as textiles and ceramics, from the Vicus, Moche, Chimú, Lambeyeque and Inca cultures. The Tumba Real (Royal Tombs of Sipán Museum), established in 2002, contains artefacts from the Moche tombs of the Lord of Sipan, of which fourteen have been excavated.

Dating from around 2000 BCE, the Ventarron temple is one of the oldest found in the Americas, as reported by the Peruvian archeologist Walter Alva.

Culture

Lambayeque is also the home of King Kong milk candy, a popular dessert with filling made of fresh milk, pineapple sweets and sometimes peanut. 

The region is also known for alfajores.

References

External List

Populated places in the Lambayeque Region
Cities in Peru